Ryan Johnson (born 1979) is an Australian actor.

Early life
Johnson attended Somerset College on the Gold Coast, and graduated from Queensland University of Technology in 1999.

Career
He made his acting debut in 2000 featuring in performances on stage, television and film. His film credits include City Loop (2000), The Wannabes (2003), Thunderstruck (2004), All My Friends Are Leaving Brisbane (2007), Monkey Puzzle (2008), Jucy (2010) and Guardians of the Tomb (2018). He appeared in his first major television role in the short-lived Head Start in 2001, followed by roles in successful Australian drama series, including All Saints, The Secret Life of Us, Underbelly, Sea Patrol, Rake, Love Child and House Husbands. In 2007, he guested in an episode of CSI: New York. 

In October 2011, it was announced Johnson had joined the main cast of US drama Fairly Legal for its second season, as trial attorney Ben Grogan. The series was cancelled at the end of the season due to low ratings.

For five seasons, Johnson played Matt Knight in the drama series Doctor Doctor (2016–2021). For his performance, he earned a nomination for the Logie Award for Most Outstanding Supporting Actor in 2017. 

Johnson played Paulie Rosetta, brother of Angelo Rosetta (Luke Jacobz), in the television soap opera Home and Away in 2010. In April 2022, he rejoined the cast as wealthy gambler and villain Peter "PK" King.

Personal life
Johnson lives with partner Leah Da Gloria, a designer, and has one child, a daughter.

Filmography

Television

Film

Short film
 Jet Set (2001) as Young Tourist
 Stuffed Bunny (2002) as Marcus
 Book Em (2004) as Warren
 Europe (2005) as European man
 Fallers (2007) as Kenneth
 Nic & Shauna (2010) as Nicholai
 Family Values (2011) as Tom
 Gull (2012) as Teddy
 Kevin Needs to Make New Friends: Because Everyone Hates Him for Some Reason (2004) as Stewart
 Perry (2016) as Ben
 Concern for Welfare (2018) as Sambo

Theatre
The Beauty Queen of Leenane, Sydney Theatre Company, Sydney, 2000.
Men, by Brendan Cowell, Pleasance Dome, Edinburgh, 2004.
Ninja, by Tamara Asmar, the Old Fitzroy Theatre, Sydney (as a director), 2005.
Jesus Hopped the 'A' Train, Belvoir St Downstairs, Belvoir St Theatre, Sydney, 2007.
Rabbit, Sydney Theatre Company, Sydney, 2008.
The Lonesome West, Belvoir St Downstairs, Belvoir St Theatre, Sydney, 2009.
80 Minutes No Interval, Old Fitzroy Theatre, Sydney, 2016.

References

External links
 

1979 births
Australian male film actors
Australian male television actors
Living people
Queensland University of Technology alumni
Male actors from the Gold Coast, Queensland